Sea monsters are beings from folklore believed to dwell in the sea and often imagined to be of immense size. Marine monsters can take many forms, including sea dragons, sea serpents, or tentacled beasts. They can be slimy and scaly and are often pictured threatening ships or spouting jets of water. The definition of a "monster" is subjective; further, some sea monsters may have been based on scientifically accepted creatures, such as whales and types of giant and colossal squid.

Sightings and legends

Sea monster accounts are found in virtually all cultures that have contact with the sea. For example, Avienius relates of Carthaginian explorer Himilco's voyage "...there monsters of the deep, and beasts swim amid the slow and sluggishly crawling ships." (lines 117–29 of Ora Maritima). Sir Humphrey Gilbert claimed to have encountered a lion-like monster with "glaring eyes" on his return voyage after formally claiming St. John's, Newfoundland (1583) for England. Another account of an encounter with a sea monster comes from July 1734. Hans Egede, a Dano-Norwegian missionary, reported that on a voyage to Godthåb on the western coast of Greenland he observed:

a most terrible creature, resembling nothing they saw before. The monster lifted its head so high that it seemed to be higher than the crow's nest on the mainmast. The head was small and the body short and wrinkled. The unknown creature was using giant fins which propelled it through the water. Later the sailors saw its tail as well. The monster was longer than our whole ship.

Ellis (1999) suggested the Egede monster might have been a giant squid.

There is a Tlingit legend about a sea monster named Gunakadeit (Goo-na'-ka-date) who brought prosperity and good luck to a village in crisis, people starving in the home they made for themselves on the southeastern coast of Alaska.

Other reports are known from the Pacific, Indian and Southern Oceans (e.g. see Heuvelmans 1968). Cryptozoologists suggest that modern-day monsters are surviving specimens of giant marine reptiles, such as an ichthyosaur or plesiosaur, from the Jurassic and Cretaceous Periods, or extinct whales like Basilosaurus. Ship damage from Tropical cyclones such as hurricanes or typhoons may also be another possible origin of sea monsters. 

In 1892, Anthonie Cornelis Oudemans, then director of the Royal Zoological Gardens at The Hague, saw the publication of his The Great Sea Serpent, which suggested that many sea serpent reports were best accounted for as a previously unknown giant, long-necked pinniped.

It is likely that many other reports of sea monsters are misinterpreted sightings of shark and whale carcasses (see below), floating kelp, logs or other flotsam such as abandoned rafts, canoes and fishing nets.

Alleged carcasses

Sea monster corpses have been reported since recent antiquity (Heuvelmans 1968). Unidentified carcasses are often called globsters. The alleged plesiosaur netted by the Japanese trawler Zuiyō Maru off New Zealand caused a sensation in 1977 and was immortalized on a Brazilian postage stamp before it was suggested by the FBI to be the decomposing carcass of a basking shark. Likewise, DNA testing confirmed that an alleged sea monster washed up on Newfoundland in August 2001, was a sperm whale. 

Another modern example of a "sea monster" was the strange creature washed up in Los Muermos on the Chilean sea shore in July 2003. It was first described as a "mammoth jellyfish as long as a bus" but was later determined to be another corpse of a sperm whale. Cases of boneless, amorphic globsters are sometimes believed to be gigantic octopuses, but it has now been determined that sperm whales dying at sea decompose in such a way that the blubber detaches from the body, forming featureless whitish masses that sometimes exhibit a hairy texture due to exposed strands of collagen fibers. The analysis of the Zuiyō Maru carcass revealed a comparable phenomenon in decomposing basking shark carcasses, which lose most of the lower head area and the dorsal and caudal fins first, making them resemble a plesiosaur.

In May 2017, The Guardian published an article claiming a giant sea monster's corpse was found in Indonesia, and also published an alleged photograph of "it."

Example

* 
 Aspidochelone, a giant turtle or whale that appeared to be an island and lured sailors to their doom
 Bakunawa
 Capricorn, Babylonian Water-Goat featured in the Zodiac
 Cai Cai-Vilu
 Cetus, a monster sent by Poseidon to devour Andromeda, only to be destroyed by Perseus
 Charybdis of Homer, a monster whose mouth formed a whirlpool that sucked any ship nearby beneath the ocean
 Cirein-cròin
 Curruid, from whose bone the Gae Bulg is made in Celtic mythology
 Devil Whale, a demonic whale the size of an island
 Hafgufa, a whale of fabulous size, described as a sjóskrímsli 'sea monster' together with the lyngbakr
 Hydra, Greek multi-headed dragon-like beast
 Iku-Turso, reputedly a type of colossal octopus or walrus
 Ipupiara
 Jörmungandr, the Midgard Serpent and nemesis of Thor in Norse mythology
 Kraken, a gigantic octopus, squid, or crab-like creature
 Lacovie
 Leviathan
 Lusca
 Makara
 Proteus
 Scylla of Homer, a six-headed, twelve-legged serpentine monster that devoured six men from each ship that passed by
 Sirens
 'Super stinger', the Arctic lion's mane jellyfish 
 Taniwha
 Tiamat
 Timingila
 Umibōzu
 Yacumama

Older reports
Sea monsters reported first or second hand include
 A giant octopus by Pliny (not to be confused with the documented Giant Pacific octopus)
 Sea monk
 Various sea serpents
 Tritons by Pliny
 Cormac Ua Liatháin in the 6th century supposedly saw a horde of tiny creatures the size of frogs that had spines, which attacked his boat in the North Atlantic according to an account written by Adomnan of Iona

Newer reports

 Cadborosaurus of the Pacific Northwest
 Champ of Lake Champlain 
 Chessie of the Chesapeake Bay
 Nessie of Loch Ness
 Issie of Lake Ikeda, Kyushu
 Ogopogo of Okanagan Lake
 Lusca
 Morgawr
 Ningen, a humanoid creature sighted in the seas north of Japan
 Fjörulalli, also called Shore Laddie, Arnarfjörður, Westfjords, Iceland
 Sea Horse Arnarfjörður, Westfjords, Iceland
 The Shell monster Arnarfjörður, Westfjords, Iceland
 Hafmaður Arnarfjörður, Westfjords, Iceland

In fiction
Creatures of H. P. Lovecraft's Cthulhu Mythos, including Cthulhu itself. 
Creatures in such sci-fi/horror films as Deepstar Six, The Rift, Deep Rising and Deep Shock.
Clover
Cyrus from Cyrus the Unsinkable Sea Serpent by Bill Peet
Fictional portrayals of the Giant Squid, like in Twenty Thousand Leagues Under the Sea.
Giant octopus in It Came from Beneath the Sea.
 Iku-Turso in Lönnrot's Kalevala
 Giganto
Godzilla
Mothra (Aqua Form)
Gorgo
Manda
Kraken as depicted in Clash of the Titans (both the 1981 and 2010 versions).
Kraken as depicted in Pirates of the Caribbean: Dead Man's Chest.
Ebirah
Titanosaurus
Zigra
Moby Dick
Rhedosaurus
The Terrible Dogfish
Jaws
Sigmund and the Sea Monsters
Sea Serpent as depicted in C.S. Lewis' novel, The Voyage of the Dawn Treader, and its 2010 film adaptation, The Chronicles of Narnia: The Voyage of the Dawn Treader.
The Meg, the giant moray eel Great Abaia, and the giant squid Lusca. The Great are 3 sea monsters featured as bosses in the survival video game Stranded Deep
In Ninjago: Seabound, Wojira is a Giant Sea Serpent and Dragon that can controls water and wind using the storm and wave amulets.
In the 2021 film: Luca, Luca Paguro and his friend, Alberto Scorfano are 12-13 year old sea monsters that assume the form of Humans when they are dry on land.
the 2022 film: The Sea Beast

See also
 Here be dragons

References

Monster
Maritime folklore